The 1979 Asian Women's Volleyball Championship was the second edition of the Asian Championship, a quadrennial international volleyball tournament organised by the Asian Volleyball Confederation (AVC) with Volleyball Association of Hong Kong (VBAHK). The tournament was held in British Hong Kong from 7 to 14 August 1979.

Results

|}

|}

Final standing

References
Results (Archived 2009-05-06)

International volleyball competitions hosted by Hong Kong
A
Asian women's volleyball championships
Asian Women's Volleyball Championship, 1979
1979 in Hong Kong women's sport